Season twenty-two of the television program American Experience originally aired on the PBS network in the United States on November 2, 2009, and concluded on May 10, 2010. The season had eight new episodes and began with the film The Civilian Conservation Corps.

Episodes

References

2009 American television seasons
2010 American television seasons
American Experience